Laodamia may refer to:

 Laodamia, the name of several characters in Greek mythology
 Laodamia (moth), a genus of moths
 "Laodamia" (Wordsworth), a poem by William Wordsworth
 1011 Laodamia, an asteroid